Andrew W. Marlowe (sometimes Andrew Marlowe) is an American screenwriter. Marlowe is best known for being the creator of, a executive producer of, and a writer on Castle, a crime mystery and comedy-drama TV show, that ran on ABC from 2009 to 2016, starring Nathan Fillion in the eponymous role.

Biography
Marlowe graduated from Columbia University in 1988 with a degree in English Literature, and attended the University of Southern California where he obtained his MFA in Screenwriting in 1992.

Screenwriting
He won the Nicholl Fellowship award for screenwriting for his script The Lehigh Pirates. Apogee, a space-based adventure he wrote soon after, sold for $500,000. He went on to write Air Force One, End of Days and Hollow Man.

He wrote the unproduced scripts Hammer Down, Alien Prison and a Western intended for Harrison Ford and John Woo. He is the creator and executive producer of the ABC TV series Castle, which he also frequently wrote. He also created the TV series Take Two and the revival of The Equalizer

He is working on two film screenplays, Manhunt and a film adaptation of the comic book character Nick Fury.

Novels
Marlowe is purportedly the ghostwriter (or co-writer) of Heat Wave, a mystery novel published September 28, 2009, attributed to the fictional Richard Castle—the title character of the Castle TV series; the novel itself is a plot element in the show. The author acknowledges Marlowe's wife Terri E. Miller as "my partner in crime". The book debuted at number 26 on The New York Times Best Seller list.

Personal life 
Marlowe lives in Los Angeles with wife and fellow screenwriter Terri Edda Miller; she has two children from her first marriage

Filmography 
Film writer
 Air Force One (1997)
 End of Days (1999)
 Hollow Man (2000)

Television

Notes

External links
 

Living people
20th-century male writers
21st-century American male writers
American male screenwriters
American television writers
Columbia College (New York) alumni
American male television writers
USC School of Cinematic Arts alumni
Year of birth missing (living people)
21st-century American screenwriters